Stochastic semantic analysis is an approach used in computer science as a semantic component of natural language understanding.

Stochastic models generally use the definition of segments of words as basic semantic units for the semantic models, and in some cases involve a two layered approach.

Example applications have a wide range. In machine translation, it has been applied to the translation of spontaneous conversational speech among different languages. In the area of spoken language understanding the fact that spoken sentences often do not follow the grammar of a language and involve self-corrections, repetitions, and other irregularities, the use of stochastic semantic has been suggested as a natural fit to achieve robustness to deal with noise due to the spontaneous nature of spoken language.<ref>R. De Mori et al, Spoken language understanding  in IEEE Signal Processing Magazine, May 2008 Volume: 25 Issue: 3, pages 50 - 58 ISSN 1053-5888</ref>

References
 Stochastically-based semantic analysis'' by Wolfgang Minker, Alex Waibel, Joseph Mariani 1999

Notes

Natural language processing